The 47th Newfoundland and Labrador House of Assembly was elected on October 11, 2011. Members of the House of Assembly were sworn in on October 27, 2011, and former cabinet minister Ross Wiseman was named Speaker of the House of Assembly the same day.

Members

Seating plan

Standings changes in the 47th Assembly

References

47